Gilles Duarte (born 21 May 1972), better known by his stage name Stomy Bugsy, is a French rapper and actor from Sarcelles, France.

Biography
Born in Paris on 21 May 1972 from Republic of Cape Verde, Duarte co-founded hip hop band Ministère AMER in the early 90s. In 1996, he started a solo career with the album Le Calibre qu'il te faut (The calibre that you need) and found great success with the single "Mon papa à moi est un gangster". Going on to release 5 more full-length solo albums, 10 collaborative albmus including one live record with hip-hope collective Secteur Ä. His latest solo release is Royalties in 2015, released online on April 27, 2015.

Duarte has also had several acting roles especially Ma 6-T va crack-er in 1997, 3 Zeros in 2001, Gomèz and Tavares in 2003, Nèg maron in 2005 and Anna Meyer, assistante de choc in 2006, Aliker in 2008 which he portrayed André Aliker,  a Martinique Communism journalist in the 1930s, he later appeared in Bye Bye Blondie (2012), an adaptation of a book by author Virginie Despentes.

Stage name
His origin of the stage name was known in the 1980s his second part of the name Bugsy is named after the mafia Bugsy Siegel

Personal life

He has two sons, Bilal, born in 1992, who started a rapping career in 2014 under the stage name Sonof, and Lat Dior born in 2013

Stomy Bugsy is the nephew of the former Thai boxing champion Aurelién Duarte.

Discography

Albums
 Le prince des lascars (1996) (The prince of thugs) 
 Le calibre qu'il te faut (1996) (The calibre that you need)
 Oh Lé Lé Lé (Cabo Verde) REMIX (1996)
 Trop jeune pour mourir (2000) (Too young to die)
 Black Pimp Fada (2000)
 4ème Round (2003) (4th (French) Round (English))
 Rimes Passionnelles (2007) (Rhymes of passion)
 Royalties (2015)

With Ministère AMER:
 Pourquoi Tant de Haine (1992)
 95200 (1994)
 L'Intégrale (2 CD) - Compilation
 Les Meilleurs Dossiers (2004)

Compilation albums
Le Secteur Ä (Live) (1998)
Mixomatose (1999)
Secteur Ä All Stars (2000)
Double Pénétration (2001)
Nos probéza ké nos rikéza (2006) with Mc Malcriado, in Cape Verdean Creole

Singles
 "Le prince des lascars" ("The Prince of Thugs") (1992)
 "Mes forces décuplent quand on m'inculpe"
 "Mon papa à moi est un gangster" ("My Father is a Gangster")
 "La vie c'est comme ça"
 "Gangster d'amour" ("Gangster in Love")
 "Black Pimp Fada" (with Michel Gohou) (2000)
 "Une femme en prison" ("A Woman in Prison") (feat Kelly Rowland) (2003)
 "Aucun Dieu ne pourra me pardonner (feat. Nâdiya) ("No god can forgive me")
 Ho lé lé lé (Cabo Verde) (feat. Izé)
 "Motivation"
 "Viens avec moi" (feat Passi)
 "Sois Hardcore" (2008)
Remix version by Alpha 5.20, Tequilla, James Kpage, Lino Despo Rutti and a few others
 "Même pas mort" (2008)
 "Demain j'arrête" (2009)

Other recordings and collaborations
Partial list
1995:
Ministère A.M.E.R. - "Sacrifices de poulets" on the film soundtrack La Haine
Hamed Daye feat. Stomy Bugsy - "Travail au corps" on the compilation  L'Art D'Utiliser Son Savoir by DJ Desh
1996:
Stomy Bugsy - "Le prince des lascars" (Casino Mysto Remix) on the maxi Le Prince Des Lascars
Stomy Bugsy feat. Karlito - "Bouche à bouche à un mort", on the CD single Oh Lé Lé Lé
Stomy Bugsy feat. Les Rongeurs - "Show Lapin" (Bunny Show) on the maxi Oh Lé Lé Lé Remixes
1997:
Nèg' Marrons feat. Ministère AMER, Doc Gynéco, Hamed Daye & Ärsenik - "Tel Une Bombe" on the album Rue Case Nègres by Nèg' Marrons
Stomy Bugsy - "Avoir le pouvoir" on the film  Ma 6-T Va Crak-Er
Stomy Bugsy - "Histoire de seuf" on the double CD Mes Forces Décuplent Quand On M'Inculpe by Stomy Bugsy
DJ Kheops feat. Stomy Bugsy - "Le Play-Boy de Sarcelles" on the album Sad Hill by DJ Kheops (IAM)
Passi feat. Stomy Bugsy - "Le Keur Sambo" on the album Les Tentations by Passi
TSN feat. Doudou Masta, EJM, Lamifa, Sages Po', Nemesis & Ministère AMER - "La solidarité noire" on the album Le Mal De La Nuit by TSN
Cercle Rouge Productions feat. Assassin, IAM, Ministère AMER, Fabe, Yazid, Rootsneg', Sléo, Ménélik, Soldafadas, Arco, Mystik, Kabal, Azé, Radikalkicker - "11'30 contre les lois racistes" on a double CD 11'30 Contre Les Lois Racistes by Cercle Rouge
1998:
Donya feat. Stomy Bugsy - "Morgan de toi" on the album 100 Regrets by Donya
Stomy Bugsy feat. Kybla - "Donne Moi Du Rêve" on the movie soundtrack Zonzon
Cut Killer feat. Fonky Family, KDD, Ménélik & Stomy Bugsy - "Écoute le style rap 98" on the promotional 2CD Écoute le style rap
Rainmen feat. Stomy Bugsy - "La Rage Au Mic" on the album Armaguedon by Rainmen
1999:
Jane Fostin feat. Stomy Bugsy - "Quand Stomy te fuit" on the compilation Indigo R'n'B
Djamatik feat. Stomy Bugsy & Pit Baccardi - "Reggae Night" on the album Djamatik Connections by Djamatik
2000:
Stomy Bugsy - "No comment" (also as "No Comment") on the compilation L'Hip Hopée Vol.2
Stomy Bugsy, Ärsenik & Jane Fostin - "On Ira Tous au paradis" on the film soundtrack Trafic D'Influence
Izé feat. Stomy Bugsy - "Propulse" on the album Double Nationalité by Izé
2001:
Passi feat. Stomy Bugsy - "Le Plan B-2 (La Cicatrice)" on the album Genèse by Passi
Hamed Daye feat. Stomy Bugzy - "Le Plan B-3 (La Mèche et La Brèche)" on the album L'or Noir by Hamed Daye
Stomy Bugsy feat. Lion Bizness (Djamatik & Kulu Ganja) - "Prise d'otages" on the double CD Prise D'Otages by Stomy Bugsy
Stomy Bugsy - "J'reviens au rap dur" on the double CD Prise D'Otages by Stomy Bugsy
2002:
Hamed Daye & Stomy Bugsy - "Instinct" on the film soundtrack Samouraï
Stomy Bugsy - "Motivation" on the film soundtrack 3 Zéros
Stomy Bugsy & Doc Gynéco - "Bugsdoc 18" feat Doc Gynéco on the compilation Explicit 18
Doc Gynéco feat. Stomy Bugsy - Frotti Frotta "(C'est l'amour qui contrôle)" on the album Solitaire by Doc Gynéco
Stomy Bugsy - "Freestyle" on the mixtape What's The Flavor #50 by DJ Poska & Funky Maestro
Ministère AMER feat. Doc Gynéco & Hamed Daye - "Le Colis" (promotional title)
2003: 
Doc Gynéco feat. Stomy Bugsy & Janik MC - "Big Up" on the album Menu Best Of by Doc Gynéco
2004:
K.Ommando Toxik feat. Stomy Bugsy - "Sacrifice 2 poulets" on the street CD Retour Vers Le Futur by K.Ommando Toxik
Passi feat. Stomy Bugsy & Zao - "Combattants" on the album Odyssée by Passi
Darkman feat. Stomy Bugsy & S Galo - "Kreol oriental" on the album Darky Le Jour, Daman La Nuit by Darkman
Ministère AMER feat. Hamed Daye & Doc Gynéco - "Plan B" on the mixtape Los Angeles Most Wanted by DJ Noise
2005:
Cuizinier(TTC) feat. TTC, Sté Strausz & Stomy Bugsy - "Dans le club" ("By the Club") (San Andreas Remix) on the CD Pour Les Filles Vol. 1 by Cuizinier
Ministère AMER - "J'aime le Rap" ("I Am the Rap") on the compilation Illicite Projet by Medeline
"Les Meurtres se font la nuit" on the compilation West Rider 2
2006:
Johnny Hallyday feat. Ministère A.M.E.R. & Doc Gynéco - "Le Temps Passe" on the album Ma vérité by Johnny Hallyday
Doc Gynéco feat. Stomy Bugsy - "Tu mens" on the album Un Homme Nature by Doc Gynéco
Stomy Bugsy - "Foot 2 Rue" on an LP Foot 2 Rue
"L'état" on the mixtape Poésie Urbainz Vol.2
2007:
Stomy Bugsy - "Brûlez tout" on the compilation Écoute la rue Marianne
Stomy Bugsy - "Tolérance zéro" (Zero Tolerance) on the compilation Explicit Politik
Seth Gueko feat. Stomy Bugzy - "Lève toi et braque" on the compilation Self Défense
2008:
 Stomy Bugzy, feat. SMS - "Click" on the album by SMS Click la ruée vers l'or
 Stomy Bugzy, feat. Booba, Lino, Dieudonné, Lady Laistee, Hamed Daye & Sofiane - "Code noir" ("Code Black")
 Stomy Bugzy, feat. Dobe As and Driver - "Miss Mec" on the compilation Bandana Music
 SÄ Remix feat. Samsey and Driver - "Mous'sä Well Maiky"
"Come Back" Remix feat Pit Bacardi
2011:
 Stomy Bugsy feat Aelpéacha et Real Chanty - "Au Soleil" on the album Val 2 Marne Rider II

Filmography 

 Ma 6-T va crack-er (1997) (My hood will crack-er)
 Beauté Fatale (2000) (Fatal Beauty)
 De l'amour (2001) (About love)
 Pretty Things (2001) 
 Le Boulet (2002) (The drag)
 3 zéros (2002) (3 zeros)
 Le Fleuve (2003) (The River)
  (2003) (Gomez and Tavares)
 Nèg Maron (2005) (The concealed man)
 The Best of Times (2006) 
 Gomez contre Tavares (2007) (Gomez vs Tavares)
 Sang Froid (2008) (Cool)
 Aliker (2009)
 Bye Bye Blondie (2012)

Television
Frappes interdites (2005)
Anna Meyer (Anna Meyer, assistante de choc) (2006)
La Glisse (2011)
Falco (2015)

References

External links

 

1972 births
Living people
French rappers
21st-century Cape Verdean male singers
French people of Cape Verdean descent
Musicians from Paris
French male film actors
20th-century French male actors
21st-century French male actors
French male television actors
Rappers from Val-d'Oise